The Enterobacterial Holin (EBHol) Family (TC# 1.E.48) consists of many closely related proteins of 100 to 120 amino acyl residues (aas) in length with a single C-terminal transmembrane segment (TMS). They derive from γ-proteobacteria of many genera: Salmonella, Escherichia, Klebsiella and Photorhabdus, and their phage. As of March 2016, these proteins have not been functionally characterized. A representative list of proteins belonging to the EBHol family can be found in the Transporter Classififcation Database.

See also 
 Enterobacteriales
 Holin
 Lysin
 Transporter Classification Database

Further reading 
 Reddy, Bhaskara L.; Saier Jr., Milton H. (2013-11-01). "Topological and phylogenetic analyses of bacterial holin families and superfamilies". Biochimica et Biophysica Acta (BBA) - Biomembranes 1828 (11): 2654–2671. . . .
 Saier, Milton H.; Reddy, Bhaskara L. (2015-01-01). "Holins in Bacteria, Eukaryotes, and Archaea: Multifunctional Xenologues with Potential Biotechnological and Biomedical Applications". Journal of Bacteriology 197(1): 7–17. . . . .
 Wang, I. N.; Smith, D. L.; Young, R. (2000-01-01). "Holins: the protein clocks of bacteriophage infections". Annual Review of Microbiology 54: 799–825. . . .
 Young, R.; Bläsi, U. (1995-08-01). "Holins: form and function in bacteriophage lysis". FEMS Microbiology Reviews 17 (1-2): 191–205. . .

References 

Protein families
Membrane proteins
Transmembrane proteins
Transmembrane transporters
Transport proteins
Integral membrane proteins
Holins